HMAS Patricia Cam was an auxiliary vessel operated by the Royal Australian Navy during World War II. She was sunk by a Japanese aircraft in 1943.

Construction
The ship was built in 1940 at Brisbane Waters, New South Wales as a tuna-fishing trawler for the Sydney fishing company Cam & Sons Pty Ltd.

Operational history
Following the outbreak of war in the Pacific, the ship was requisitioned by the Royal Australian Navy for use as an auxiliary minesweeper on 9 February 1942. She was commissioned into the RAN on 3 March 1942 as HMAS Patricia Cam, with a complement of 2 officers and 17 sailors.

Based in Darwin, Patricia Cam was mainly used to transport supplies to small communities, military outposts, and Coastwatchers.

Loss
In January 1943, the vessel sailed through the islands off Arnhem Land. At one stop, they picked up six passengers: five Yolngu Aborigines including Narritjin Maymuru, and Reverend Leonard Kentish, chief of the Methodist mission stations in the Northern Territory. Patricia Cam then sailed for the Wessel Islands.

On 22 January, while en route, a Japanese floatplane located Patricia Cam and attacked; the unaware vessel had no radar. The first bomb landed in Patricia Cams hold and exploded, killing one sailor. The damage caused the ship to sink within a minute. A second bomb from the floatplane killed another sailor and two of the passengers. The floatplane made several strafing runs, then landed near the survivors. After failing to encourage the survivors to surrender, one of the crew captured Kentish at gunpoint (the only Australian prisoner-of-war captured inside Australian territory) and left. Kentish was flown to Dobo in the Aru Islands where he was interrogated, including the frequent use of beatings, for several weeks, before being executed by his captors on or about 4 May.

All but two of the remaining survivors were on a liferaft. The others were clinging to debris, and drifted away; the remains of one were found nine years later in a cave on Valencia Island,  from the point of sinking. The life raft drifted for 15 hours before coming to an islet off Guluwuru. The survivors swam ashore and fell asleep on the beach, waking to find that one of the crew had died from his wounds during the night. One of the passengers died the next day, with both bodies buried on the beach. Fires lit by the survivors were spotted by natives of the Wessel Islands, who came across in canoes to render assistance. Two groups left to find help, one group of natives paddling south, the other leading Patricias captain to the Marchinbar Island radar station.

The vessel's military service was later recognised with the battle honour "Darwin 1942–43".

References

External links
 

Ships built in New South Wales
1940 ships
Minesweepers of the Royal Australian Navy
Patrol vessels of the Royal Australian Navy
World War II minesweepers of Australia
Ships sunk by Japanese aircraft
Shipwrecks of the Northern Territory
Fishing ships of Australia
Maritime incidents in January 1943
Minesweepers sunk by aircraft